This article addresses the history of women's magazines.

In 1693 the first issue of the first women's magazine in Britain, The Ladies' Mercury, was published.

In 1857 the first women's magazine in Gujarati, Streebodh, was established by Parsi social activists.

In 1886 the first Malayalam women's magazine, Keraleeya Suguna Bodhini was published from Thiruvananthapuram, Kerala.

In 1892 the first women's magazine in Egypt, and indeed in all the Arab countries, Al Fatat, was established by Hind Nawfal. Another women's periodical, Fatat al-Sharq was first published in 1906. 

In the period before the American Civil War, Godey's Lady's Book was a United States women's magazine that was the most widely circulated magazine. Its circulation rose from 70,000 in the 1840s to 150,000 in 1860.

In 1919 Mabel Malherbe of South Africa founded the first Afrikaans women's magazine, which was called Die Boerevrou.

Published from 1934 to 1945, the NS-Frauen-Warte, the Nazi magazine for women, had the status of the only party approved magazine for women and served propaganda purposes, particularly supporting the role of housewife and mother as exemplary.

In 1952 the first English language women's magazine  in Ceylon was  founded and published by Sita Jayawardana. Titled Ceylon Woman it had a tagline "The Premier women's magazine of Ceylon" It.covered  fashion, society events and  short stories. The magazine helped launch a generation of  designers and artists.The magazine  also ran an annual fashion show and various other cultural activities to raise money for social causes.

In 1963 Betty Friedan's book The Feminine Mystique was published; it is widely credited with sparking the beginning of second-wave feminism in the United States. In Chapter 2 of the book Friedan stated that the editorial decisions concerning women's magazines at the time were being made mostly by men, who insisted on stories and articles that showed women as either happy housewives or unhappy careerists, thus creating the "feminine mystique"—the idea that women were naturally fulfilled by devoting their lives to being housewives and mothers. Friedan also stated that this was in contrast to the 1930s, at which time women's magazines often featured confident and independent heroines, many of whom were involved in careers. However, historian Joanne Meyerowitz argued (in "Beyond the Feminine Mystique: A Reassessment of Postwar Mass Culture, 1946-1958," Journal of American History 79, March 1993) that many of the contemporary magazines and articles of the period did not place women solely in the home, as Friedan stated, but in fact supported the notions of full- or part-time jobs for women seeking to follow a career path rather than being a housewife. These articles did however still emphasize the importance of maintaining the traditional image of femininity.

In 1992 the first women's magazine in English to be published from North East India, Eastern Panorama, was established.

Satree Sarn Magazine was Thailand's first women's magazine.

Caitríona Clear has conducted research on Irish women's magazines.

References